Tungnan University (TNU) is a private university in Shenkeng District, New Taipei, Taiwan. 

Tungnan University offers undergraduate and graduate programs in a wide range of fields including business, humanities, social sciences, engineering, information technology, and arts. The university has six colleges: College of Business, College of Humanities, College of Social Sciences, College of Engineering, College of Information Technology, and College of Arts.   

The university is also home to several research centers and institutes that focus on areas such as management, finance, cross-strait relations, and digital media.

History
TNU was originally established as Tungnan Junior College of Technology in August 1970. In 2000, the college was promoted to Tungnan Institute of Technology and promoted to Tungnan University in 2005. As a former engineering college, Tungnan is strong in a variety of  subjects from mechanical to environmental to electrical engineering. It is located in a fairly nice and convenient area several kilometers outside of Taipei city in Shenkeng, which is just east of the Taipei Zoo.

Faculties

 College of Engineering
 College of Management
 College of Applied Science
 Graduate Institute

See also
 List of universities in Taiwan

External links

 Tungnan University

1970 establishments in Taiwan
Educational institutions established in 1970
Universities and colleges in New Taipei
Universities and colleges in Taiwan
Technical universities and colleges in Taiwan